The 2018–19 UMass Minutemen basketball team represented the University of Massachusetts Amherst during the 2018–19 NCAA Division I men's basketball season. The Minutemen were led by second-year head coach Matt McCall and played their home games at the William D. Mullins Memorial Center in Amherst, Massachusetts as members of the Atlantic 10 Conference. They finished the season 11-21, 4-14 in A-10 Play to tie for 12th place. They lost in the first round of the A-10 tournament to George Washington.

Previous season
The Minutemen finished the 2017–18 season 13–20, 5–13 in A-10 play to finish in 13th place. They beat La Salle in the first round of the A-10 tournament before losing in the second round to George Mason.

Offseason

Departures

Incoming transfers

2018 recruiting class

Preseason

Roster

Schedule and results

|-
!colspan=9 style=| Exhibition

|-
!colspan=9 style=| Non-conference regular season

|-
!colspan=9 style=| A-10 regular season

|-
!colspan=9 style=| A-10 tournament

See also
 2018–19 UMass Minutewomen basketball team

References

UMass Minutemen basketball seasons
Umass
UMass Minutemen basketball
UMass Minutemen basketball